The Man on the Street (Italian:La bocca sulla strada) is a 1941 Italian drama film directed by Roberto Roberti and starring Armando Falconi, Carla Del Poggio and Giuseppe Rinaldi.

It was made at Cinecittà in Rome. The film's sets were designed by Giuseppe Spirito and Fratelli Cimino

Cast
 Armando Falconi as Don Gennaro Cuomo  
 Carla Del Poggio as Graziella  
 Giuseppe Rinaldi as Stelio Corsi  
 Guglielmo Barnabò as L'industriale Sebastiano Corsi  
 Vera Bergman as Alba Corsi  
 Franco Rondinella as Salvatore  
 Franco Coop as Il marchese Andrea Del Fermo  
 Vittorina Benvenuti as Donna Olimpia Del Fermo  
 Emilio Petacci as Il notaio  
 Alfredo Martinelli as Il conte Rosati 
 Alfredo Morati as Il duca D'Arcetri  
 Luisa Ventura as Giovanna  
 Giuseppe Ricagno as Il maggiordomo dei Del Fermo 
 Sergio Leone as Un bambino 
 Adele Paternò

References

Bibliography
 Landy, Marcia. Italian Film. Cambridge University Press, 2000.

External links

The Man on the Street at Variety Distribution

1941 films
Italian drama films
1941 drama films
1940s Italian-language films
Films directed by Roberto Roberti
Films shot at Cinecittà Studios
Italian black-and-white films
1940s Italian films